Ben Jones (born 24 June 1990) is an Australian former professional rugby league footballer who played in the 2000s and 2010s.

Background
Jones was born in Orange, New South Wales, Australia.

Playing career
Jones started his first-grade career with the Sydney Roosters, his NRL debut coming in round 23 of the 2008 NRL season, against the Melbourne Storm.

In the 2009 NRL season, Jones played 21 games for the club as they finished last on the table for the first time since 1966.

In 2010, Jones was called into the Indigenous All Stars representative side for the annual match against the NRL All Stars after first-choice hooker PJ Marsh withdrew because of injury. The Roosters qualified the NRL Grand Final in the 2010 season, although Jones was not a member of the Roosters' squad for the match, which lost to the St George Illawarra Dragons.

After 27 NRL matches for the Roosters, Jones joined the North Queensland Cowboys for the 2011 season. The Roosters had been unable to keep him under the NRL's salary cap. During the 2011 NRL season, he was selected to fill in for the Cowboys' captain Johnathan Thurston in the key halfback position.

Jones returned to the Sydney Roosters in 2013 via their reserve grade team Newtown.

In November 2013, it was announced that he would join the Parramatta Eels on a train and trial basis for the 2014 preseason.

References

1990 births
Living people
Australian rugby league players
Indigenous Australian rugby league players
Sydney Roosters players
North Queensland Cowboys players
Indigenous All Stars players
Prime Minister's XIII players
Mackay Cutters players
Newtown Jets NSW Cup players
Redcliffe Dolphins players
Junior Kangaroos players
Rugby league centres
Wentworthville Magpies players
Rugby league halfbacks
Rugby league fullbacks
Rugby league five-eighths
Rugby league hookers
Gamilaraay
Rugby league players from Orange, New South Wales